State Road 704 (SR 704), also known as Okeechobee Boulevard, is a  east–west boulevard in the West Palm Beach area, known for being dangerous to pedestrians and bicyclists. It extends from an intersection with SR 7 at the border of West Palm Beach and Royal Palm Beach and just south of The Acreage at the western end to an intersection with SR A1A in Palm Beach at the east end.

Route description
State Road 704 begins at the intersection of Okeechobee Boulevard and State Road 7, with commercial areas surrounding three of the corners.  SR 704 heads east through the suburban West Palm Beach area known as Century Village passing by strip malls and gated communities.  Just east of its intersection with Jog Road, SR 704 crosses over Florida's Turnpike, and provides access to the turnpike just east of the bridge.  At this point, Okeechobee Boulevard becomes a stroad, commercial and development becomes denser, and the West Palm Beach skyline becomes visible.  The stroad continues, passing through Haverhill Boulevard, Military Trail and Palm Beach Lakes Boulevard. East of Congress Avenue, which provides access to Palm Beach International Airport, SR 704 heads towards an interchange with Interstate 95 (I-95 and SR 9), crossing over it, and immediately crosses Clear Lake, with a diamond interchange with Australian Avenue at the eastern end of the lake.  One block east of the interchange, SR 704 crosses railroad tracks owned by Tri-Rail (formerly the CSX Miami Subdivision), and becomes a one-way pair, as it travels along the southern end of downtown West Palm Beach, passing by CityPlace to the north and the Palm Beach County Convention Center to the south.  East of the two complexes, Okeechobee Boulevard crosses the Florida East Coast Railroad, and then the southbound lanes of U.S. Route 1 (US 1), with the eastbound lanes passing by the northern end of Palm Beach Atlantic University from here to the Intracoastal Waterway.  One block east of southbound US 1, SR 704 crosses the northbound lanes of US 1, with the westbound lanes becoming Lakeview Avenue.  Two blocks east of northbound US 1, SR 704 crosses the Intracoastal Waterway (Lake Worth) via the Royal Park Bridge, and enters Palm Beach as Royal Palm Way, and travels three blocks through the town before ending one block west of the ocean at SR A1A.

West of the western terminus of SR 704, Okeechobee Boulevard continues for another , acting as the main east-west road of Royal Palm Beach and Loxhatchee Groves, until an intersection with Seminole Pratt Whitney Road in Loxahatchee.  Just beyond the end of Okeechobee Boulevard (but accessible only from Southern Boulevard, US 98-US 441/SR 80) is Lion Country Safari, a zoological park through which visitors drive instead of walk.

History
SR 704 was established in the 1945 renumbering.  The road was not designated as a state road in the pre-1945 system, and only known as a local road called Okeechobee Road.

Major intersections

County Road 704A

County Road 704A (CR 704A) is the official designation of Australian Avenue, a partially limited access road connecting SR 708 (Blue Heron Boulevard) in Riviera Beach with US 98/SR 80 (Southern Boulevard) and SR 807 (Congress Avenue) in Glen Ridge. The road was formerly State Road 704A (SR 704A).

The southernmost  serve Palm Beach International Airport.  North of its interchange with SR 704, Australian Avenue continues along the eastern shores of Clear Lake and Lake Mangonia, then northward as a surface road, passing through Mangonia Park before reaching its northern terminus, an intersection with Blue Heron Boulevard (SR 708) in Rivera Beach.

Major intersections

References

External links

704
704
704